Irving Glacier is a glacier that flows northwest between the Coombs Hills and Wyandot Ridge to enter Odell Glacier, in the Convoy Range of Victoria Land, Antarctica.

See also
 List of glaciers in the Antarctic
 Glaciology

Notes

References

Glaciers of Scott Coast